Chatrapathi or Chatrapathy may refer to:
 Shivaji, a Maratha sovereign who founded the Maratha Empire

Films
 Chatrapathy (2004 film), a 2004 Tamil film starring Sarath Kumar and Nikita Thukral
 Chatrapathi (2005 film), a 2005 Telugu film directed by S. S. Rajamouli and starring Prabhas and Shriya Saran
 Chatrapathi (2013 film), a 2013 Kannada film directed by Dinesh Gandhi and starring Siddarth and Priyadarshini